The Deer Ridge Correctional Institution is a state prison for men located in Madras, Jefferson County, Oregon, owned and operated by the Oregon Department of Corrections.  The facility opened in 2007 and holds a maximum of 1867 inmates, 1223 at medium security and 644 at minimum security.

References

Prisons in Oregon
Buildings and structures in Jefferson County, Oregon
2007 establishments in Oregon
Madras, Oregon